Kity may refer to:

 KITY (102.9 FM) Llano, Texas, USA
 KITY-FM 92.9, former callsign of San Antonio, Texas, USA radio station FM 92.9 KROM

Other uses
 K.K.Kity (Japanese band)

See also
 Dąbrowa-Kity, a village in north-eastern Poland
 Kitty (disambiguation)